Ian Theodore Douglas (born May 20, 1958) is the former bishop of the Episcopal Church in Connecticut.

Biography 
He was ordained to the diaconate on June 11, 1988, and to the priesthood on June 24, 1989. He was elected fifteenth, and current,  Bishop of the Episcopal Church in Connecticut on October 24, 2009. His election marked the first time in the diocese's 224-year history that a priest from outside the diocese was elected bishop. He was consecrated on April 17, 2010. He was previously Angus Dun Professor of Mission and World Christianity at Episcopal Divinity School in Cambridge, Massachusetts. He also served as priest associate at St. James's Episcopal Church in Cambridge, Massachusetts from 1989 to 2010.  Douglas earned degrees from Middlebury College (B.A.), Harvard University Graduate School of Education (Ed.M.), Harvard Divinity School (M.Div.) and Boston University (Ph.D.).  Douglas is married to Kristin Harris.  They are the parents of Luke, Timothy, and Johanna.

Douglas is a member of the Standing Committee of the Anglican Communion. He is also Vice-Chair of Episcopalians for Global Reconciliation.

In 2015, Douglas was one of the candidates for election as the 27th Presiding Bishop of The Episcopal Church.

In April 2021, Douglas announced his plan to retire in fall 2022.

See also 
 List of Episcopal bishops of the United States
 Historical list of the Episcopal bishops of the United States

References

External links 
Diocesan website

1958 births
Living people
Harvard Divinity School alumni
Harvard Graduate School of Education alumni
Episcopal Church in Connecticut
Middlebury College alumni
Boston University alumni
Episcopal bishops of Connecticut